Pablo Legorreta is a Mexican-American billionaire businessman, and the founder of Royalty Pharma, the "world's biggest acquirer of pharmaceutical royalty streams".

Legorreta earned a Bachelor of Science in Engineering from Universidad Iberoamericana.

Legorreta is married, with two children, and lives in Sag Harbor, New York.

References

 
Living people
American billionaires
American company founders
Universidad Iberoamericana alumni
People from Sag Harbor, New York
Year of birth missing (living people)